Zverevo is a town in Rostov Oblast, Russia, located  northeast of Rostov-on-Don. Population:

History
Zverevo grew from a mining settlement, which was founded in the beginning of the 20th century. It was granted urban-type settlement status in 1929 and town status in 1989.

Administrative and municipal status
Within the framework of administrative divisions, it is, along with one rural locality, incorporated as Zverevo Urban Okrug—an administrative unit with the status equal to that of the districts. As a municipal division, this administrative unit also has urban okrug status.

References

Notes

Sources

External links

Official website of Zverevo 
Zverevo Business Directory  

Cities and towns in Rostov Oblast